Juan Manuel Tenuta (Fray Bentos, Uruguay, 23 January 1924 – Buenos Aires, Argentina, 5 November 2013) was a Uruguayan actor, active in Argentina.

He is most remembered for his roles in Waiting for the Hearse, I Don't Want to Talk About It and Night of the Pencils.

Married to actress Adela Gleijer, he was father of the actress Andrea Tenuta.

References

External links
 
 

1924 births
2013 deaths
People from Fray Bentos
Uruguayan male film actors
Uruguayan expatriate actors in Argentina
Uruguayan communists
Burials at La Chacarita Cemetery